Clan Mackenzie was a  cargo ship which was built in 1942 for the Ministry of War Transport (MoWT) as Empire Cato. In 1948 she was sold to Clan Line and renamed Clan Mackenzie, serving until 1960 when she was scrapped.

Description
The ship was built by William Gray & Co. Ltd., West Hartlepool. She was launched on 10 November 1942 and completed in December.

She had a GRT of 7,039 and a NRT of 4,851.

The engine was built by the Central Marine Engine Works, West Hartlepool.

History
Empire Castle was built for the MoWT. She was placed under the management of the Hain Steamship Co Ltd. She was allocated the United Kingdom Official Number 168949. The Code Letters BFLC were allocated and her port of registry was West Hartlepool.

Empire Cato was a member of a number of convoys during the Second World War.

ON 169
Convoy ON 169 departed Liverpool on 22 February 1943 and arrived at New York on 21 March. Empire Cato was in ballast.

KMS 58G
Convoy KMS 58G detached from Convoy OS 84 on 1 August 1944. Convoy OS 84 had departed from Liverpool on 21 July and arrived at Freetown, Sierra Leone on 10 August. Empire Cato was towing LCT 1319 and LCT 7020, bound for Augusta, Italy.

KMS 90
Convoy KMS 90 detached from Convoy OS 116. Convoy OS 116 had departed from Liverpool on 13 March 1945. Convoy KMS 90 arrived at Gibraltar on 21 March.

In 1948, Empire Cato was sold to Clan Line Steamers Ltd and renamed Clan Mackenzie. She was the fourth Clan Line ship to bear that name. Clan Mackenzie served until 1960. She arrived at Hong Kong on 14 October 1960 for scrapping.

References

1942 ships
Ships built on the River Wear
Ministry of War Transport ships
Empire ships
Steamships of the United Kingdom
Ships of the Clan Line
Merchant ships of the United Kingdom